Panelefsiniakos F.C., the Panelefsiniakos Athletic Club, is a football club based in the city of Elefsina, Greece. The club currently competes in Football League. The team was formed in 1931.

History
Panelefsiniakos was formed in 1931. The club has played in the top level of Greek football, the Alpha Ethniki, three times (1962, 1968 and 1999), but was relegated after each season. The club has also played in the second level, Beta Ethniki, for 25 seasons.

After a series of relegations, the club has played for many years in the local West Attica championships. In 2013, the team promoted in the Football League 2 after 11 years. The new administrators of the team give hope for the future to the fans, signed experienced players from Football League and well-known players in Greece, such as Wellington Gonçalves and Ivan Rusev, who played for many years in the Greek Super League.

Stadium
The current stadium of Panelefsiniakos is the Municipal Stadium of Elefsina (capacity 1,800) located in Elefsina, which built in 1978 and opened in 1981. Next to the stadium, there is the fitness center, which constitutes a part of the athletic center. It also has seats for journalists and beaten path. The old stadium of the team was "Evangelos Doukas Stadium".

Honours and achievements

Football League
 Winners (2): 1961, 1967

Gamma Ethniki
 Winners (1): 2015

Association Football Clubs West Attica
 Winners (3): 2004, 2009, 2012

First Division of Piraeus Local Championship
 Winners (1): 1961

Second Division of Piraeus Local Championship
 Winners (1): 1947

Third Division of Piraeus Local Championship
 Winners (1): 1946

Professional history
 3 seasons in Super League
 29 seasons in Football League
 14 seasons in Football League 2
 7 seasons in Delta Ethniki
 5 seasons in the Regional Leagues

League history

Notable former players
 Greek players
 Ioannis Kalitzakis
 Thomas Kyparissis
 Kostas Fragolias
 Giorgos Barkoglou
 Alekos Rantos
 Manolis Psomas
 Alexandros Kaklamanos
 Giorgos Zacharopoulos
 Nikolaos Platanos
 Charalambos Economopoulos
 Lefteris Kouvidis

 Foreign players
 Oleh Protasov
 Koffi Amponsah
 Ivan Rusev
 Wellington

References

 
Football clubs in Attica
1931 establishments in Greece
Elefsina
Gamma Ethniki clubs